Streptomyces luteosporeus is a bacterium species from the genus of Streptomyces. Streptomyces luteosporeus produces acetopyrrothine and indolmycin.

See also 
 List of Streptomyces species

References

Further reading

External links
Type strain of Streptomyces luteosporeus at BacDive -  the Bacterial Diversity Metadatabase	

luteosporeus
Bacteria described in 1991